Two Seconds is a 1932 American pre-Code crime drama film directed by Mervyn LeRoy and starring Edward G. Robinson, Vivienne Osborne and Preston Foster. It was based on a successful Broadway play of the same name by Elliott Lester. The title refers to the two seconds it takes the condemned person to die in the electric chair after the executioner throws the switch. Preston Foster reprises the role he played on the Broadway stage.

Plot

As John Allen, a condemned murderer, is led to the electric chair, a witness asks the prison warden how long it takes for the condemned person to die. "A strongly built man like John Allen? It'll take two seconds." The witness remarks, "That'll be the longest two seconds of his life." As the executioner throws the switch, the events that led up to the execution appear in flashback.

John works with his friend and flatmate Bud Clark, as riveters, on the girders of a skyscraper under construction, getting paid $62.50 a week, "more than a college professor." Bud is engaged to be married, and tries to set up a date for Allen that night, but Allen expresses disinterest because Bud keeps setting John up with "firewagons", his term for fat girls. Bud and John go out on the town after Bud winning $38 on the horses. John sees that the girl that Bud's girl has brought along for him to double date is a "firewagon", so he splits off on his own, going to a Taxi dance hall nearby, where he meets dancer Shirley Day. After dancing and talking to Shirley for some time, he indicates that they should talk some more. "Can't. Gotta have a ticket". "Well OK", John dozily says. "Get a handful so we can dance a lot together." In the five minutes John is away buying tickets, Shirley has gone off with another customer. That customer gropes her, and Shirley causes a scene, shouting at the customer, "He paid a dime and he thinks that entitles him to privileges." John wades in, punching the customer to the floor. Tony, the dance hall owner, tells them both to get out, firing Shirley. John then takes Shirley for a milk shake.

Earlier, John had said to Shirley that he wanted a woman with an educational aspirations: "Ain't no use both of us being dumb." Shirley feigns respectability, telling John that she only works in the dance hall to support her sick parents, who live on a farm in Idaho and that she is educated ("I've got a year of high school, wish I'd have stuck it out"). Shirley pretends to be interested in attending a lecture with him. Later, Bud is remonstrating with John about him having hooked up with "a dance hall dame." "How much money has she had off you," Bud asks. "Not a red cent. We're going to a lecture," John says. Bud: "if a dame tells a guy she's going to a lecture that means one thing, she's got designs on him." John indicates that he doesn't want to fall out with Bud, trying to get him to like Shirley: "She knows things." Bud: "That dame don't need to go to school, she knows everything." As John leaves, Bud says more cheerily, "Come home sober and bring me a lollipop." Instead of taking John to "a lecture," Shirley takes him to a speakeasy where she gets him drunk on "tea," bootleg gin was served in teapots to disguise its true nature, as alcohol was illegal then, due to prohibition. When John protests, she says stupidly that they can "catch the second show" of the lecture. John is drunk after the first floor show, drunk, bored, and belligerent. He says that Shirley herself shouldn't drink too much. She intones, "I must, because of my troubles." "What troubles?" John responds. Shirley starts crying, "Don't do that." John says, "Not when I'm drunk, I hate that." He then brightens up a bit smiling with the realization, "I'm drunk." Liquor was illegal and managing to get "blind drunk" (sometimes literally, the substances being methanol, not alcohol) was something of an achievement. Shirley kisses him, cheering him up greatly. "You know I like that," he says. Shirley responds, "Would you like more?"

Shirley drags John to a Justice of the Peace. John thinks he is still in the speakeasy. He still has a teacup hooked on his finger and is yelling for a waiter to get more drink. The Justice of the Peace says John is too drunk to continue the ceremony, but Shirley bribes him with $10, and indicates that she already has a ring, which she has had for some weeks. When Shirley and a stupefied John return to his apartment, Shirley has a blazing argument with Bud. Bud: "You dirty little ape, did you rope him in? Didn't take you long to find out he can't hold his liquor." Shirley shows him the ring: "We're married, right square and legal, and there's nothing that you or anyone else can do about it." Shirley throws Bud out. As Bud is leaving, Shirley is getting undressed to consummate the marriage somehow, to a drunk John. Bud says to the comatose John, "You said you'd bring me back a lollipop. You did alright and a red one at that." He flicks a lit cigarette at Shirley's naked back.

Three weeks later, Bud and John are doing their high-rise riveting job, 28 stories up. During a break, they argue about Shirley. Bud berates John for being taken in by a liar: "She told you that her parents were living on a farm in I-dee-ho, and all the time they're living in a booze joint on Tenth Avenue." John admits that Shirley has had much of his money for clothes "which she needed". Bud: "where do you think she goes in the daytime?". John: "she goes to the movies!" Bud: "what about all the money she gets? There ain't enough dimes in the day, even if she were on a merry-go-round!" John: "Don't talk that way about my wife!" John angrily lunges at Bud with a spanner and Bud falls to his death, shown spinning, screaming as John, flat on his stomach looks over, watching him fall, yelling, "Bud! Bud!"

John is a hunched, nervous depressed wreck, with Shirley nagging him. Shirley: "How long you gonna keep on being like this? Makes me sick to look at ya. Why don't you go out and get yourself a job?" John: "I can't get one. I tried." Shirley: "You can go back to riveting." John: "I can't go back to that, not ever since Bud ... I can't climb ... when I get up there, my head swims, I get sick, afraid, I gotta hold on. One minute he was standing there talking to me and the next he was flying through space, his fingers clawing, trying to catch hold of something and nothing for him to grab. And then when he hit." Shirley mocks his nervous condition, sneering, mimicking him, "I can't do it, I can't climb, I'm afraid." She asks him if he's got any insurance. A kindly doctor (Harry Beresford) is called and gives him a tonic. John says that it's his nerves. The doctor says that John's problem is psychological.

Shirley is putting a new dress on, new stockings and going out. "Where did you get those things?" John asks. "Tony," Shirley says belligerently. "There, how do I look?" she asks. "Like what you are," he replies. John says that she can't go out looking that way, as his wife. Shirley indicates that she has credibility now, "with the other girls," as she's married, "there are things a Mrs. can get away with that a Miss can't." Lizzie, the cleaning lady (Dorothea Wolbert), tells Shirley that the landlady is after them for the rent. John indicates that they must put this off and pay her later. Lizzie indicates that they'll get thrown out: "Her brother's a cop you know." Shirley pulls a clip of money out of her stocking. "Where did you get that from?" John asks. "Tony." Shirley tells him that the money is an "advance." She then tells John that she is trying to get Buds ex-girlfriend Annie, who she met at Bud's funeral, a job at the dance hall. Allen: "Not Annie!. Annie was Bud's steady company [girlfriend]. You can't make a tramp out of Annie!" Shirley throws a dollar at John Allen as she leaves. "Here's a buck in case you need anything."

John has been betting on horses using techniques of multiple bets ("polys") used by Tony. The horse racing bookmaker, arrives at the apartment. John asks, "What do you want?" Bookie tells him, "You've won!" John: "How much?" Bookie: "$388". John (brightening up momentarily) "$388?". Bookie: "Niftiest little poly I ever saw ... With that kind of money you can clear a lot of debt." John says, "I'll clear them ALL off, that's what Bud would have wanted me to do." Bookie: "Don't talk like that." A deranged John insists that he only wants $172 of the winning, then rummages in a cupboard to find his teacup, the one he had on his finger when he married Shirley. "This teacup was once filled with bootleg liquor, then it was filled with the blood of my only friend." He throws the teacup on the ground, smashing it and exclaims, "I'm going to be FREE!" John nervously counts out what Shirley got from Tony and enough for a gun.

John then strides off purposively to Tony's dance hall, where he finds Shirley in Tony's arms. Tony: "What is this? Are you trying to play the outraged husband gag on me?" John thrusts $162 into the hands of Tony, who doesn't want it, then turns to Shirley: "You. You made a rat out of me. Bud was right, you were born rotten and now you're trying to make other girls as rotten as you are." ("Born crooked," was how Bud had described Shirley, when arguing with John, just before falling to his death.) Shirley turns to Tony in panic, "Tony he's going to kill me!" Johns sweaty deranged face is shown in closeup: "Yeah, I'm going to kill you. If I don't you're going to go on like this, from Tony to another man, always making yourself cheaper and dirtier." He fires several bullets into Shirley as Tony runs out of the room howling.

At his trial, John states he should have been "burned" (electrocuted) when he was at his lowest, a "rat," living off Shirley, not when he had paid off his debts. He makes a pitiful, deranged allocution statement, pleading, "It isn't fair! It isn't fair to let a rat live and kill a man! It isn't reasonable! It don't make sense! I won't let you do it!"

The judge informs John that he could have used a defence of insanity, but chose not to. The sentence is death.

Cast
 Edward G. Robinson as John Allen
 Vivienne Osborne as Shirley Day
 Guy Kibbee as Bookie
 Preston Foster as Bud Clark
 J. Carrol Naish as Tony
 Frederick Burton as Judge
 Harry Beresford as Doctor
 Dorothea Wolbert as Lizzie, Cleaning Lady
 Berton Churchill as The Warden
 William Janney as College Boy At Execution
 Edward McWade as The Prison Doctor
 Otto Hoffman as S J Peters, Justice of the Peace
Adrienne Dore as Annie

Production
Mervyn LeRoy said in the 70s, when talking about the film, that at the time his production team were "highly organised". LeRoy directed five films in 1932 alone. The sound clarity is because of Vitaphone sound on disk technology.

Reception
Although he called it "a sordid and melancholy study" that was "glum and gruesome" and "minus any comedy relief", New York Times critic Mordaunt Hall also found a lot to like in Two Seconds. "Edward G. Robinson contributes a remarkably forceful portrayal," he wrote, adding that the film was "adroitly done [and] compels attention." He called LeRoy's direction "imaginative and lifelike" and praised the supporting cast: "Preston Foster plays Bud Clark, a rôle he also interpreted on the stage. His acting is capital. Vivienne Osborne is very real as the conscienceless Shirley. J. Carroll Naish makes the most of the part of Tony." In summary, he writes: "In spite of its drab tale, it calls forth admiration, for it never falters."

Variety's 1932 review was less enamored: "General slowness and stodgy overdramatics won't draw the flaps, nor will a tragic finale help." In later years, prolific critic Leslie Halliwell tersely called Two Seconds a "competent, pacy crime melodrama".

The film has been called an early (or first) example of film noir.

Cultural references
When a girl says to Preston Foster "who's the smiling lieutenant over there", in reference to a sourfaced John Allen (Robinson), she's making a reference to the 1931 Ernst Lubitsch film The Smiling Lieutenant

"She ain't no Peggy Joyce" Bud Clarke to John Allen (referring to a date he's setting John Allen with ('works in a laundrette')) Later: "There I was trying to get you Peggy Joyce and you go and get yourself hog tied to a dance hall dame" (Bud Clarke). Peggy Hopkins Joyce (May 26, 1893 – June 12, 1957) was an American actress, artist model and dancer. In addition to her performing career, Joyce was known for her numerous engagements, six marriages to wealthy men, subsequent divorces, scandalous affairs, her collection of diamonds and furs and her generally lavish lifestyle.

"Kewpie"  doll. Early in the film John Allen is saying that he wants a girl with education. Bud: "You got me worried, next thing I know you'll be going sour on me n trippin' with one of them kewpies and a study book". Mass produced "Kewpie" dolls, the representation of a comic strip character, were prolific in the US at the time. Bud is jokingly insinuating that John Allen will become childish: "I aint bunking with no lily".

There's a reference to James Cagney (The Public Enemy, 1931) and grapefruit. Bud (Preston Foster) to girl in the street "why don't you let me sit across from ya, and squirt grapefruit juice in your eye, like they do in the movies". That refers to the notorious scene in The Public Enemy, in which Cagney viciously mashes a grapefruit into the face of Mae Clarke at breakfast.

"The old army game". Bud (Preston Foster), when Shirley Day brings John Allen back drunk, after having dragged him off to get married (she slipped the priest $10 because he was too drunk to stand). Bud Foster to Shirley Day: "I'm not going to let you pull the old army game on him" Shirley: "I'm not trying to pull the army game on him. He's married to me, right square and legal. (she shows Bud the ring) and there's nothing you, he or anyone can do about it!". The "army game" is the simplest con-trick, the "shell game", which, if you didn't know what it was, you would be easily taken in by. WC Fields refers to it when observing a shell (cup and ball) game proceeding in the 1926 Silent It's the Old Army Game. "That's the old army game" he says sagely, exposing the fraudster. The game would have been common in the army during the first world war.

The Manhattan Municipal Building, which still exists. In the scenes of Bud and John riveting girders and their argument, it's the building shown prominently, centrally in the cityscape. The city marriage bureau was in that building. Bud makes a reference to it when arguing with Shirley Day. Johns demise results from his marriage to Shirley Day, who gets him drunk and drags him there. Johns argument with Bud about it, results in Bud falling his death.

When John Allen understands the true nature of Shirley Day, he says "I should throw you out". Shirley Day responds mockingly "Then the goose would stop laying the golden egg", as she was the only one bringing money into the house. That is a reference to one of Aesops fables The goose that laid the golden eggs, an idiom used of an unprofitable action motivated by greed.

Latonia Race Track, Kentucky. When the bookmaker (Guy Kibbee) meets Bud and John outside Tonys dance hall, to pay out Tonys winnings of $38, bookie tries to get Tony to bet again: "How about something on the nose at Latonia tomorrow". Latonia, once regarded as among the United States' top sites for racing was closed in 1939, during the great depression.

Reference to Astor Hotel. Bud in talking to the two girls "Got anything special on tonight?" "Yeah, we were just about to get a bite to eat at the Astor". Bud: "Don't try to pull no astor stunts on me. I don't come from the Bronx (poor area). Coupla drinks, the speak, a dance & maybe a movie." Bud is telling them he has money to spend. Hotel Astor was a prestige hotel located in the Times Square area of Manhattan, in operation from 1904 through 1967. Featured a long list of elaborately themed ballrooms and exotic restaurants: the Old New York lobby, the American Indian Grill Room with artifacts collected with the help of the American Museum of Natural History, a Flemish smoking room, a Pompeiian billiard room, the Hunt Room decorated in sixteenth century German Renaissance style, and many other features.

"Owl dining car". Bud, when chatting up two girls in the street: "Got anything special on tonight?" Girl: "Yeah, we were just about to get a bite to eat at the Astor." Bud: "You got the Astor mixed up with the owl dining car aintcha?" Girl: "The owl aint so bad at that". What were termed "owl wagons" from 1888, became furnished, fixed, "night owl" branded diners; converted streetcars which proliferated in New York City when drinking alcohol was prohibited by the Volstead Act from 1920-1933. The "streetcar" styling of a diner today reflects its first form.

A speakeasy, also called a blind pig or blind tiger, in the film as a "speak", is an establishment that illegally sells alcoholic beverages. Such establishments came into prominence in the United States during the Prohibition era of 1920 to 1933. During that time, the sale, manufacture, and transportation (bootlegging) of alcoholic beverages was illegal throughout the United States.
When Shirley Day asks John Allen what he does for a living John Allen replies "Oh, I'm a riveter." "That's where you get those big muscles. How much do you earn?", she asks. "$62.54" (weekly) John responds. "You and Rockefeller!", Shirley enthuses. That is a reference to John D Rockefeller (1839-1937), who was the richest man in America at the time.

Home media
Two Seconds was released by Warner Bros. in 2010, on made-on-demand DVD as part of their Warner Archive series.

References

External links
 
 
 
 

1932 films
1932 crime drama films
American black-and-white films
American crime drama films
American films based on plays
1930s English-language films
Films about capital punishment
Films directed by Mervyn LeRoy
First National Pictures films
1930s American films